"I'll Listen" is a song by Dutch DJ and record producer Armin van Buuren. It features vocals and lyrics from Anglo-Spanish singer and songwriter Ana Criado. The song was released in the Netherlands by Armind as a digital download on September 10, 2012. The song is included in van Buuren's compilation Universal Religion Chapter 6.

Background
It is the third collaboration between van Buuren and Criado, after the songs "Down to Love" in 2010 (included in the album Mirage) and "Suddenly Summer" in 2012 (included in the compilation A State of Trance 2012).

Reviews 
The website "Trance History" considers "I'll Listen" as "one of the most interesting vocal trance tracks of 2012".

Music video
A music video to accompany the track was released to YouTube on September 21, 2012. It is a video mix taken from a concert at Privilege Ibiza with Armin van Buuren and Ana Criado during summer 2012.

Track listing
 Digital download 
 "I'll Listen" (original mix) – 7:22
 "I'll Listen" (radio edit) – 3:36

 Remixes – digital download 
 "I'll Listen" (Super8 & Tab remix) – 7:14
 "I'll Listen" (John O'Callaghan dark mix) – 7:05
 "I'll Listen" (Disfunktion remix) – 6:13
 "I'll Listen" (Super8 & Tab radio edit) – 3:28
 "I'll Listen" (John O'Callaghan dark edit) – 3:42
 "I'll Listen" (Disfunktion radio edit) – 3:33

Charts

References

2012 singles
Armin van Buuren songs
2012 songs
Songs written by Armin van Buuren
Armada Music singles
Songs written by Benno de Goeij